Ndong or N'Dong may refer to:

José Ndong Machín Dicombo (born 1996), also known as Pepín, Equatoguinean professional footballer
Pablo Ndong Esi (1969–2010), better known as Boyas, Equatoguinean football goalkeeper and manager
Aminata Ndong (born 1980), Senegalese former fencer
Avelina Ndong (born 2003), Equatorial Guinean footballer
Basilio Ndong (born 1999), Equatoguinean professional footballer
Benjamín Ndong (born 1999), Equatoguinean footballer
Boniface Ndong (born 1977), Senegalese retired basketball player and current coach
Didier Ndong (born 1994), Gabonese professional footballer
Emiliana Nchama Ndong (born 1986), Equatorial Guinean footballer
Emmanuel Ndong (born 1992), Gabonese professional footballer
Henri Junior Ndong (born 1992), Gabonese professional footballer
Jean Eyeghé Ndong (born 1946), Gabonese politician
Juan Ecomo Ndong, Equatoguinean political activist currently imprisoned on weapons possession charges
Ousmane Ndong (born 1999), Senegalese professional footballer
Parfait Ndong (born 1971), Gabonese former professional footballer
Patrick Nguema Ndong (1957–2021), French-Gabonese journalist on Gabon's Africa N°1 radio station
Ramona Mibuy Ndong (born 2002), Equatoguinean international footballer
Raymond Ndong Ndong (born 1988), professional Cameroonian footballer
Reginaldo Ndong (born 1986), Equatoguinean track and field sprint athlete
Sang Ndong, Gambian football manager and former player
Steeve Nguema Ndong (1971–2009), Gabonese judoka
Ulysse Ndong (born 1992), French-born Gabonese professional footballer
Jean-Daniel Ndong Nzé (born 1970), Gabonese footballer
Raymond Ndong Sima (born 1955), Gabonese politician who was Prime Minister of Gabon from February 2012 to January 2014

See also
Ndong Awing Cultural & Development Association, created 1962 to develop the Awing village and Fondom in the Northwest Region of Cameroon
Nedong (disambiguation)